Anaeropsis is a genus of stilt-legged fly. It is found in New Guinea.

Species
Anaeropsis guttipennis (Walker, 1861)

References

Micropezidae
Nerioidea genera
Insects of New Guinea